Stefania Orsola Garello (born 31 December 1963) is an Italian stage, television and film actress.

Life and career 
Born in Arcisate, Varese into a family of Piedmontese origins, Garello spent a large part of her adolescence in the United States. 

Returned to Italy, she studied in a drama school and made her professional debut in 1985. She was mainly active on stage and on television, in TV-movies and series. Her film career mainly consists of art films and independent productions.

Filmography

References

External links  
 

1963 births
Living people 
Actors from Varese
Italian film actresses
Italian television actresses
Italian stage actresses
20th-century Italian actresses